is a 2002 Japanese romance comedy drama film about female professional shogi players directed by Kentarō Ōtani and starring Asaka Seto, Shinya Tsukamoto and Mikako Ichikawa. It was released on 23 March 2002.

Cast
Asaka Seto
Shinya Tsukamoto
Mikako Ichikawa
Jun Murakami

Reception
It was chosen as the 5th best film at the 24th Yokohama Film Festival.

References

External links

2002 romantic comedy-drama films
2002 films
Films directed by Kentarō Ōtani
Japanese romantic comedy-drama films
2002 comedy films
2002 drama films
2000s Japanese films